The Massachusetts English Language Education in Public Schools Initiative, Question 2 was a successful initiative voted on in the Massachusetts general election held on November 5, 2002. It was one of three 2002 ballot measures put to public vote, and the only one to pass.

The initiative was reportedly financed by Silicon Valley multimillionaire Ron Unz, while it was opposed by the Massachusetts legislature’s Joint Committee on Education, Arts and Humanities.

Voting
Question 2 on the ballot, "English Language Education in Public Schools".

A YES VOTE would require that, with limited exceptions, all public school children must be taught English by being taught all subjects in English and being placed in English language classrooms.

A NO VOTE would make no changes in English language education in public schools.

Source:

References

Further reading
 

Public education in Massachusetts
2002 Massachusetts ballot measures
Initiatives in the United States
Linguistic rights
United States education law